Loch Skiach is a small freshwater loch in Perth and Kinross, Scotland, situated 4 miles (6.4 km) southwest of Ballinluig. Directly south of Loch Skiach is the smaller Little Loch Skiach

Gallery

References

External links
 Loch Skiach and Craig Lochie Walk
 The bothy at Loch Skiach
 Walking circuit

Skiach
Skiach
Tay catchment